Jordi Pagans i Monsalvatje (18 April 1932 – 4 January 2017) was a Catalan and Spanish painter.

Biography

Artistic Tradition
Pagans was born in El Masnou, on 18 April 1932. Son of Alfred Pagans i Llauró and Clara Monsalvatje i Iglèsias, both coming from families of a long and rich artistic tradition which included members such as the guitar player and singer Llorenç Pagans i Julià (1838–83), brother of his grand grandfather, and good friend of Wagner and Edgar Degas' father. In  several Degas’ paintings, the chanteur Pagans is portrayed alongside the painter's father.

Also, his grandfather, Francesc Monsalvatje i Fossas (1853–1917), developed important historical studies about the ancient Country of Besalú. Not to forget his uncle Xavier Monsalvatje i Iglèsias (1881–1921), writer and painter, and finally his cousin Xavier Montsalvatge i Bassols (1911–2002), who is considered the most important Catalan composer of his generation.

Artistic career

Jordi Pagans began painting in 1948. In 1950 he studies with Saturo López and assists to night classes in the School of Fine Arts of Barcelona. In 1956 he works in the "atelier" of Josep Roca Sastre, whose teachings and orientation are decisive in his formative years. The paintings of this period show that Pagans was already a master expressing the essentials, using as his own the concepts of impressionist and cubist schools. In 1955, he spends a couple of months in Paris, visiting the Louvre and the Jeu de Paume Museums, walking and taking sketches of the great Parisian avenues and boulevards.

He began exhibiting his work in group shows in 1953. He gains early recognition receiving in 1956 the Royal Circle Artistic Award from the Council of Barcelona and the "Rafael Llimona" Award in 1959, year in which he makes his first solo exhibit in the Municipal Gallery of Girona. In 1961 his work is shown for the first time in the "Club dels Quatre Vents" in Paris. The Ateneu Barcelonés shows his work in January 1962. Since then, his work has been exhibited continuously till the present (currently he is exhibiting in Girona).

In the 60's he keeps a close friendship with painter and historian Rafael Benet i Vancells (1899–1979) whose teachings were decisive. Rafael Benet enjoyed sharing time with young artists and considered Pagans one of his very favourites. The group that gathered at the café-restaurant "El Glaciar" of the Ramblas in Barcelona included Benet, Pagans, Humbert, Prim, Pruna and Alfred Figueres, among others. In 1963 he takes part of the "Realitat Visual" group, whose ideas about painting may be summarised as: painting should be a never-ending state of crisis between intelligence and the sensible as well as between knowledge and the feeling of reality.

Along these years (1963–1965), Jordi Pagans knows the marvellous landscape of Cadaqués, which since that moment captivates him. This small town of the northern Spanish Catalan coast and the sites around it offer the artist a peculiar and structured landscape which reveals itself as a pre-existence of his own dreamed landscape. Already a solid context of masses is characteristic of his paintings, and furthermore, the quiet and broad sense of the figurative and realistic composition, which his work has developed since then.

Artistic Style

In absence of violent contrast and supported by the Mediterranean conception of light and colour it is remarkable in his career the constant maturation of an almost gestual modulation techniques of form and volume based upon brush strokes full of impasto. Pagans i Monsalvatje sees painting as a personal interpretation of the artist but capable of arriving to the onlooker through a never-ending state of crisis between knowledge and the feeling of reality.

Through his career, Jordi Pagans has worked and investigated with different materials to paint his urban and Mediterranean landscapes and still lives. He has arisen not only as an oil painter but also as a drawer, watercolorist, pastel and gouache painter. Not to forget his graphic work done in a great diversity of techniques but fundamentally etchings.

Exhibitions

Awards

1956
"Real Círculo Artístico" award, Concourse of new painters, Barcelona council

1959 
Young painting award "Rafael Llimona", Sala Parés, Barcelona

1967 
Honor diploma "XI Salon de Mayo", Barcelona

1968
Second prize in the painting concourse "Vila de Centelles"

1969 
Third position in the Vallès art meeting, Granollers
First position in thepainting concourse "Vila de Centelles
Second position in the "National" concourse of Amposta

1972 
"María Grifé" award, VII Concourse "Vila de Palamós"

1974  
"Ministerio de la Vivienda" prize
IX Concourse "Vila de Palamós"

1975
"María Trías" award (in memorial), "Vila de Palamós"

1980 
"Ciudad de Huesca" diploma, IV Biennal Nacional de Huesca

1982
Special mention (Official diploma), Sala de Avignon, France
Honorifical mention in the VIII Biennal of Vilafranca del Penedès

Bibliography
 Diccionari Biogràfic Contemporani. Ed. Círculo de Amigos de la Historia. Madrid, 1970			
 Centenari del Centre Excursionista de Catalunya. Homenatge dels Artistes Catalans. Ed. Centre Excursionista de Catalunya. Barcelona, 1976
  Gran Enciclopèdia Catalana, vol. 11. Ed. Enciclopèdia Catalana. Barcelona, 1978
 Espinàs, J.M.: Visions de Cadaqués. 33 gravats de J. Pagans i Monsalvatje, pòrtic de Jordi Benet i Aurell. Ed. Gabinet d'Art, Grup 33. Olot, 1978 (edició de bibliòfil)
 Diccionari "Ràfols" de Artistes de Catalunya, Balears i València. Ed. "La Gran Enciclopèdia Vasca". Barcelona, 1979
 Pagans Monsalvatje. Biblioteca "Maestros actuales de la pintura y escultura catalanas", vol. 45. Jordi Benet. Ed. "La Gran Enciclopèdia Vasca". Barcelona, 1979, 52 Pág.
 Fontbona, F.: El Paisatgisme a Catalunya.
 Tharrats, J.J.: Cent anys de pintura a Cadaqués. Ed. Cotal. Barcelona, 1981
 Amir, X.: Els pintors de la Costa Brava avui. Ed. Xavier Amir. Barcelona, 1982
 Santos Torroella, R. (Dir.): Enciclopèdia Vivent de la Pintura i l'Escultura Catalanes, vol. VII. Ed. Àmbit. Barcelona, 1985
 Portada de la "Revista Gal. Art", Barcelona, no. 14, May 1985
 Plana, M. (Dir.): Homenatge a Josep Pla. Ed. Miquel Plana. Olot, 1989 (edició de bibliòfil)
 Sabata Serra, X. (Dir.): Guia d' Art 1991. Ed. Art Book 90 S. L. Barcelona, 1991
 Coromina, V. (Dir.): 90 Artistes dels 90. Ed. Art Invest. S.A., Genève, 1992
 Sabata Serra, X. (Dir.): Guia d’Art 1994. Ed. Art 85 S.L. Barcelona
 Encuentro con el Arte: Pintores y escultores Espanyoles. Ed. Angélica Guevara. Barcelona. 1995
 Sabata Serra, X. (Dir.): Guia d’Art 1995-1996. Ed. Art  85 S. L. Barcelona
 Historia de L’Art Català: Segle XX Volumen IX. Ed. 62. Author F.Gutierrez
 Cent Paisatgistes: Josep Mª Cadena. Edicions Vicens Coromina. Barcelona, 1997
 Artistes del 99: Edicions Vicens Coromina. Barcelona, 1999
 Pintores y escultores: Encuentro con las artes. Ed. Angélica Guevara. Barcelona, 2000
 Figures: Josep Mª Cadena. Edicions Vicens Coromina. Barcelona, 2000
 Artistas y Pintores de España. Edició Vicens Coromina. Edicions d’Art 2001
 Interiors: Josep Mª Cadena. Edicions Vicens Coromina. Barcelona, 2003
 Pagans Monsalvatje: Josep Mª Cadena. Barcelona, 2013

References

External links
Official Website 

1932 births
2017 deaths
Spanish artists
20th-century Spanish painters
20th-century Spanish male artists
Spanish male painters
21st-century Spanish painters
People from El Masnou
21st-century Spanish male artists